The Mérida Institute of Technology is a public institution of higher education located in Merida, Yucatan, Mexico. Established in 1961, it has two campuses.

References

External links
official website

Mérida, Yucatán
Universities and colleges in Yucatán
Educational institutions established in 1961
1961 establishments in Mexico